Bhola Nath Jha is the recipient of Padma Vibhushan (1967), the second highest civilian honour of India, for his contribution to the field of civil services.

See also 
 List of Padma Vibhushan award recipients

References 

Recipients of the Padma Vibhushan in civil service
Possibly living people
Year of birth missing